Sudipta Dewan (died on 18 July 2015) was a Awami League politician and a Jatiya Sangsad member of women's reserved seat.

Career
Dewan was elected to parliament from women's reserved seat as an Awami League candidate in 1973.

Death
Dewan died on 18 July 2015.

Personal life
Dewan's husband, AK Dewan, was the first mayor of Rangamati municipality. On 16 September 2019, her family members accused Bangladesh Nationalist Party leader Dipen Dewan of trying to forcefully grab their family property in Rangamati.

References

2015 deaths
Awami League politicians
1st Jatiya Sangsad members
Women members of the Jatiya Sangsad
20th-century Bangladeshi women politicians
Year of birth missing
Place of birth missing
Place of death missing